Paddy Hogan (born 9 May 1987) is an Irish sportsperson.  He plays hurling with his local club Danesfort and has been a member of the Kilkenny senior inter-county team since 2009.

References

1987 births
Living people
Danesfort hurlers
Kilkenny inter-county hurlers